Giardiavirus is a genus of viruses, in the family Totiviridae. Protozoa serve as natural hosts. There is only one species in this genus: Giardia lamblia virus.

Structure
Viruses in Giardiavirus are non-enveloped, with icosahedral geometries, and T=2 symmetry. The diameter is around 36 nm. Genomes are linear, around 6277kb in length. The genome has 2 open reading frames.

Life cycle
Viral replication is cytoplasmic. Entry into the host cell is achieved by attachment to host receptors, which mediates endocytosis. Replication follows the double-stranded RNA virus replication model. Double-stranded rna virus transcription is the method of transcription. Translation takes place by -1 ribosomal frameshifting, and  viral initiation. Protozoa serve as the natural host.

Taxonomy
The genus Giardiavirus has one species:
 Giardia lamblia virus

References

External links
 Viralzone: Giardiavirus
 ICTV

Totiviridae
Virus genera